The Battle of Cotagaita was fought on October 27, 1810 during the Campaign of Upper Peru in the Argentine War of Independence when the troops of the Army of the North were sent by the Primera Junta government in Buenos Aires to the Alto Perú to fight the Royalists. It was the first skirmish of the Army of the North in this theatre. The battle was fought near the town of Santiago de Cotagaita, nowadays in  Potosí Department in Bolivia.

General José Manuel de Goyeneche was appointed by the viceroy of Perú to command the royalist forces in Alto Perú, who along with the president of the Real Audiencia of Charcas, Vicente Nieto, decided to establish a forward post in Cotagaita under the command of Frigate Captain José de Córdoba y Rojas. These forces were left isolated after the pronouncement of Cochabamba (September 14) and later of  Oruro (September 24) in favor of the Junta in Buenos Aires.

The royalist forces comprised the provincial battalion of Potosí, under commander Indalecio González de Socasa; the Puno battalion; veterans of Borbón; the King's Volunteers; dragoons of Chichas and lancers of Cinti. The revolutionary forces included the first battalion under commander Gregorio Perdiel; sixth battalion under commander Carlos Forest, Hunters battalion under commander Manuel Dorrego; Blandengues battalion under commander Abraham González; and the Husars Regiment under commander Martín Miguel de Güemes.

The attack started in the early hours of the morning and ended at 2 pm the same day. Not having been able to dislodge the royalists from their trenches, Balcarce effected an orderly retreat without being chased.

After the Cotagaita action, the revolutionary forces were obligated to retreat towards Tupiza and then Suipacha, to await reinforcement, where later they achieved their first victory at the Battle of Suipacha.

References
 History of Salta

Battles of the Spanish American wars of independence
Battles of the Argentine War of Independence
Conflicts in 1810
Battles involving Spain
Battles of the Bolivian War of Independence
Battles involving Bolivia
October 1810 events
History of Potosí Department